Peştere may refer to several villages in Romania:

 Peştere, a village in Aștileu Commune, Bihor County
 Peştere, a village in Constantin Daicoviciu, Caraş-Severin
 Pestere, the Hungarian name for Peştera village, Sălașu de Sus Commune, Hunedoara County

See also 
 Peștera (disambiguation)